In the early to mid-1990s Heineken sponsored free admission four-day live music events in the United Kingdom in and around large capacity big top tents in Heineken green.

Taking place in city parks up and down the UK, the first event was held in Wollaton Park, Nottingham in 1990 headlined by John Martyn and Tom Robinson. It was co-promoted by Nottingham City Council.  Other regular venues included Swansea, Brighton, Portsmouth and Leeds. Also Bristol, Norwich, Gateshead, Sheffield and Greater Manchester.

Heineken Music Festivals featured r&b, pub rock, punk, folk-rock, world music and rock. 

From 1993 leading "Britpop" indie bands featured on Saturday evenings including Oasis, The Verve, Pulp, Pop Will Eat Itself, Sleeper, Manic Street Preachers, Blur, and Catatonia.

The Heineken events also featured long-established bands and singers including The Stranglers, Jools Holland, The Pogues, Saw Doctors, Tom Robinson Band, The Men They Couldn't Hang,  Bonnie Tyler, Richard Thompson, Labi Siffre, Siouxsie + The Banshees, Squeeze, Carmel, The Levellers, Martin Stephenson and the Daintees, Steve Harley and Cockney Rebel, Wilko Johnson, Tony Joe White, Aswad, Bhundu Boys, Jamiroquai, Kirsty MacColl, Boy George, Mike + The Mechanics. In total there were thirty free admission festivals over six years as well as several pilot events, and six indoor venue gigs in London.

There were also spin-off events and college tours. Standout being the Murphys Tours with Energy Orchard and Toss the Feathers across the UK. Respective city councils co-promoted the events. 

Granada Television broadcast a Greater Manchester event and many other festivals achieved tv coverage.  BBC4’s Hype and Hustle featured Blur at the Heineken events.

Regular house-bands included Dr Feelgood, Alias Ron Kavana, The Tansads (now Merry Hell), Oysterband, Seven Little Sisters and Chumbawamba.

Event director and promoter was Mike Eddowes, formerly head of promotions at Capital Radio in London and publicist to Elton John and Paul McCartney amongst others.

Bookers included Fiona Glyn-Jones (later Bella Union record label) and in season one Stuart Griffiths and Carrie Wagner. Event managers were Linda Harley, Miles Beacroft, Adam Ali, Gabby Taranowski, Charlie Connelly (now an author) and Tim Haines. PA was by ESS. The events were promoted and produced by Square One Events.

The last event under Heineken's sponsorship was held in Roundhay Park Leeds in July 1995, which attracted 110,000 fans on the Saturday and more than 320,000 fans over four days and was headlined by Pulp, who also headlined at Glastonbury that year. More than one million cans of Heineken lager were sold at the farewell event. It claims to be the largest ever free music event in the UK.

At the end of 1995 Heineken didn't renew their ground-breaking sponsorship, in favour of sport.

Various events continue in England and continental Europe under different names but are now paid admission shows and festivals.

1994
In 1994 there were six free festivals taking place at various locations in the United Kingdom featuring the following artists:

Preston (9–12 June)
Inspiral Carpets
The Boo Radleys
Pulp
Shed Seven
The Christians
Sister Sledge
Back to the Planet
Baby Chaos

Gateshead (23–26 June)
The Pogues
The Stranglers
Tom Robinson
Jools Holland
Toyah
Nine Below Zero

Leeds (7–10 July)
The Saw Doctors
The Stranglers
The Wedding Present
Chumbawamba
Kingmaker
Shed Seven replaced the billed Elastica
Back to the Planet
Siouxsie and the Banshees
Buzzcocks
Mike + The Mechanics
The Pogues

Nottingham (21–24 July)
Blur

Plymouth (4–7 August)
Chumbawamba
The Stranglers
Toyah
Tom Robinson

Portsmouth (18–21 August)
The Pogues

References

Music festivals in the United Kingdom